In mathematics, the resultant of two polynomials is a polynomial expression of their coefficients, which is equal to zero if and only if the polynomials have a common root (possibly in a field extension), or, equivalently, a common factor (over their field of coefficients). In some older texts, the resultant is also called the eliminant.

The resultant is widely used in number theory, either directly or through the discriminant, which is essentially the resultant of a polynomial and its derivative. The resultant of two polynomials with rational or polynomial coefficients may be computed efficiently on a computer. It is a basic tool of computer algebra, and is a built-in function of most computer algebra systems. It is used, among others, for cylindrical algebraic decomposition, integration of rational functions and drawing of curves defined by a bivariate polynomial equation.

The resultant of n homogeneous polynomials in n variables (also called multivariate resultant, or Macaulay's resultant for distinguishing it from the usual resultant) is a generalization, introduced by Macaulay, of the usual resultant.  It is, with Gröbner bases, one of the main tools of elimination theory.

Notation

In many applications of the resultant, the polynomials depend on several indeterminates and may be considered as univariate polynomials in one of their indeterminates, with polynomials in the other indeterminates as coefficients. In this case, the indeterminate that is selected for defining and computing the resultant is indicated as a subscript:  or 

The degrees of the polynomials are used in the definition of the resultant. However, a polynomial of degree  may also be considered as a polynomial of higher degree where the leading coefficients  are zero.

Definition

The resultant of two univariate polynomials over a field or over a commutative ring is commonly defined as the determinant of their Sylvester matrix. More precisely, let 

and

be nonzero polynomials of degrees  and  respectively. The map
 
such that 

is a linear map between two spaces of the same dimension.

For instance, taking  and  we get

If the coefficients of the polynomials belong to an integral domain, then 

This is a straightforward consequence of the characterizing properties of the resultant that appear below. In the common case of integer coefficients, the algebraically closed field is generally chosen as the field of complex numbers.

Properties

Characterizing properties
The following properties hold for the resultant of two polynomials with coefficients in 
a commutative ring . If  is a field or more generally an integral domain, the resultant is the unique function of the coefficients of two polynomials that satisfies these properties.

If  (that is if  is a nonzero constant) then  Similarly, if , then

Zeros
 The resultant of two polynomials with coefficients in an integral domain is zero if and only if they have a common divisor of positive degree.
 The resultant of two polynomials with coefficients in an integral domain is zero if and only if they have a common root in an algebraically closed field containing the coefficients.
In other words, the resultant of two polynomials belongs to the ideal generated by these polynomials.

Invariance by ring homomorphisms
Applying  to the coefficients of a polynomial extends  to a homomorphism of polynomial rings , which is also denoted  With this notation, we have:

 If  and  then 

These properties are easily deduced from the definition of the resultant as a determinant. They are mainly used in two situations. For computing a resultant of polynomials with integer coefficients, it is generally faster to compute it modulo several primes and to retrieve the desired resultant with Chinese remainder theorem. This property is fundamental, for example, for cylindrical algebraic decomposition.

Invariance under change of variable

This means that the property of the resultant being zero is invariant under linear and projective changes of the variable.

Invariance under change of polynomials

 

and, if , then

These properties imply that in the Euclidean algorithm for polynomials, and all its variants (pseudo-remainder sequences), the resultant of two successive remainders (or pseudo-remainders) differs from the resultant of the initial polynomials by a factor which is easy to compute. Conversely, this allows one to deduce the resultant of the initial polynomials from the value of the last remainder or pseudo-remainder. This is the starting idea of the subresultant-pseudo-remainder-sequence algorithm, which uses the above formulae for getting subresultant polynomials as pseudo-remainders, and the resultant as the last nonzero pseudo-remainder (provided that the resultant is not zero). This algorithm works for polynomials over the integers or, more generally, over an integral domain, without any division other than exact divisions (that is, without involving fractions). It involves  arithmetic operations, while the computation of the determinant of the Sylvester matrix with standard algorithms requires  arithmetic operations.

Generic properties
In this section, we consider two polynomials

and

whose  coefficients are distinct indeterminates. Let

be the polynomial ring over the integers defined by these indeterminates.
It has the following properties.

 is an absolutely irreducible polynomial.

Homogeneity
More precisely:
 It is homogeneous of degree  in 
 It is homogeneous of degree  in 
 It is homogeneous of degree  in all the variables  and 

Elimination property
 
 The ideals  and  define the same algebraic set. That is, a tuple of elements of an algebraically closed field is a common zero of the elements of  if and only it is a zero of  
 The ideal  has the same radical as the principal ideal  That is, each element of  has a power that is a multiple of 
 All irreducible factors of  divide every element of 

The first assertion is a basic property of the resultant. The other assertions are immediate corollaries of the second one, which can be proved as follows.

So  and  have exactly the same zeros.

Computation

Theoretically, the resultant could be computed by using the formula expressing it as a product of roots differences. However, as the roots may generally not be computed exactly, such an algorithm would be inefficient and numerically unstable. As the resultant is a symmetric function of the roots of each polynomial, it could also be computed by using the fundamental theorem of symmetric polynomials, but this would be highly inefficient.

As the resultant is the determinant of the Sylvester matrix (and of the Bézout matrix), it may be computed by using any algorithm for computing determinants. This needs  arithmetic operations. As algorithms are known with a better complexity (see below), this method is not used in practice.

It follows from  that the computation of a resultant is strongly related to the Euclidean algorithm for polynomials. This shows that the computation of the resultant of two polynomials of degrees  and  may be done in  arithmetic operations in the field of coefficients.

However, when the coefficients are integers, rational numbers or polynomials, these arithmetic operations imply a number of GCD computations of coefficients which is of the same order and make the algorithm inefficient.
The subresultant pseudo-remainder sequences were introduced to solve this problem and avoid any fraction and any GCD computation of coefficients. A more efficient algorithm is obtained by using the good behavior of the resultant under a ring homomorphism on the coefficients: to compute a resultant of two polynomials with integer coefficients, one computes their resultants modulo sufficiently many prime numbers and then reconstructs the result with the Chinese remainder theorem.

The use of fast multiplication of integers and polynomials allows algorithms for resultants and greatest common divisors that have a better time complexity, which is of the order of the complexity of the multiplication, multiplied by the logarithm of the size of the input ( where  is an upper bound of the number of digits of the input polynomials).

Application to polynomial systems

Resultants were introduced for solving systems of polynomial equations and provide the oldest proof that there exist algorithms for solving such systems. These are primarily intended for systems of two equations in two unknowns, but also  allow solving general systems.

Case of two equations in two unknowns

Consider the system of two polynomial equations

With some technicalities, this proof may be extended to show that, counting multiplicities and zeros at infinity, the number of zeros is exactly the product of the degrees.

General case
At first glance, it seems that resultants may be applied to a general polynomial system of equations

Unfortunately, this introduces many spurious solutions, which are difficult to remove.

A method, introduced at the end of the 19th century, works as follows: introduce  new indeterminates  and compute
 
This process may be iterated until finding univariate polynomials.

To get a correct algorithm two complements have to be added to the method. Firstly, at each step, a linear change of variable may be needed in order that the degrees of the polynomials in the last variable are the same as their total degree. Secondly, if, at any step, the resultant is zero, this means that the polynomials have a common factor and that the solutions split in two components: one where the common factor is zero, and the other which is obtained by factoring out this common factor before continuing.

This algorithm is very complicated and has a huge time complexity. Therefore, its interest is mainly historical.

Other applications

Number theory
The discriminant of a polynomial, which is a fundamental tool in number theory is the quotient by its leading coefficient of the resultant of the polynomial and its derivative.

Let  be an algebraic field extension generated by an element  which has  as minimal polynomial. Every element of  may be written as  where  is a polynomial.

Algebraic geometry

A rational plane curve may be defined by a parametric equation

An implicit equation of the curve is given by

Symbolic integration
In symbolic integration, for computing the antiderivative of a rational fraction, one uses partial fraction decomposition for decomposing the integral into a "rational part", which is a sum of rational fractions whose antiprimitives are rational fractions, and a "logarithmic part" which is a sum of rational fractions of the form

The antiderivative of such a function involves necessarily logarithms, and generally algebraic numbers (the roots of ). In fact, the antiderivative is 

The Lazard–Rioboo–Trager method produces an expression, where the number of algebraic numbers is minimal, without any computation with algebraic numbers.

Let 
 
be the square-free factorization of the resultant which appears on the right. Trager proved that the antiderivative is 

Computer algebra
All preceding applications, and many others, show that the resultant is a fundamental tool in computer algebra. In fact most computer algebra systems include an efficient implementation of the computation of resultants.

Homogeneous resultant

The resultant is also defined for two homogeneous polynomial in two indeterminates.

where  runs over the bivariate homogeneous polynomials of degree , and  runs over the homogeneous polynomials of degree .

(The capitalization of "Res" is used here for distinguishing the two resultants, although there is no standard rule for the capitalization of the abbreviation).

The homogeneous resultant has essentially the same properties as the usual resultant, with essentially two differences: instead of polynomial roots, one considers zeros in the projective line, and the degree of a polynomial may not change under a ring homomorphism.
That is:
 The resultant of two homogeneous polynomials over an integral domain is zero if and only if they have a non-zero common zero over an algebraically closed field containing the coefficients.

 The property of an homogeneous resultant to be zero is invariant under any projective change of variables.

Any property of the usual resultant may similarly extended to the homogeneous resultant, and the resulting property is either very similar or simpler than the corresponding property of the usual resultant.

Macaulay's resultant

Macaulay's resultant, named after Francis Sowerby Macaulay, also called the multivariate resultant, or the multipolynomial resultant, is a generalization of the homogeneous resultant to  homogeneous polynomials in  indeterminates. Macaulay's resultant is a polynomial in the coefficients of these  homogeneous polynomials that vanishes if and only if the polynomials have a common non-zero solution in an algebraically closed field containing the coefficients, or, equivalently, if the  hyper surfaces defined by the polynomials have a common zero in the  dimensional projective space. The multivariate resultant is, with Gröbner bases, one of the main tools of effective elimination theory (elimination theory on computers).

Like the homogeneous resultant, Macaulay's may be defined with determinants, and thus behaves well under ring homomorphisms. However, it cannot be defined by a single determinant. It follows that it is easier to define it first on generic polynomials.

Resultant of generic homogeneous polynomials
A homogeneous polynomial of degree  in  variables may have up to 

coefficients; it is said to be generic, if these coefficients are distinct indeterminates.

Let  be  generic homogeneous polynomials in  indeterminates, of respective degrees  Together, they involve

indeterminate coefficients.
Let  be the polynomial ring over the integers, in all these 
indeterminate coefficients.

The Macaulay degree is the integer  which is fundamental in Macaulay's theory. For defining the resultant, one considers the Macaulay matrix, which is the matrix over the monomial basis of the -linear map

in which each  runs over the homogeneous polynomials of degree  and the codomain is the -module of the homogeneous polynomials of degree .

Thus, instead of considering the determinant, one considers all the maximal minors, that is the determinants of the square submatrices that have as many rows as the Macaulay matrix. Macaulay proved that the -ideal generated by these principal minors is a principal ideal, which is generated by the greatest common divisor of these minors. As one is working with polynomials with integer coefficients, this greatest common divisor is defined up to its sign.

Properties of the generic Macaulay resultant
The generic Macaulay resultant is an irreducible polynomial.
It is homogeneous of degree  in the coefficients of  where  is the Bézout bound.
The product with the resultant of every monomial of degree  in  belongs to the ideal of  generated by

Resultant of polynomials over a field
From now on, we consider that the homogeneous polynomials  of degrees  have their coefficients in a field , that is that they belong to  Their resultant is defined as the element of  obtained by replacing in the generic resultant the indeterminate coefficients by the actual coefficients of the 

The "only if" part of this theorem results from the last property of the preceding paragraph, and is an effective version of Projective Nullstellensatz: If the resultant is nonzero, then

This implies that  have no other common zero than the unique common zero, of

Computability
As the computation of a resultant may be reduced to computing determinants and polynomial greatest common divisors, there are algorithms for computing resultants in a finite number of steps.

However, the generic resultant is a polynomial of very high degree (exponential in ) depending on a huge number of indeterminates. It follows that, except for very small  and very small degrees of input polynomials, the generic resultant is, in practice, impossible to compute, even with modern computers.

Therefore, computing the resultant makes sense only for polynomials whose coefficients belong to a field or are polynomials in few indeterminates over a field.

In the case of input polynomials with coefficients in a field, the exact value of the resultant is rarely important, only its equality (or not) to zero matters. As the resultant is zero if and only if the rank of the Macaulay matrix is lower than its number of its rows, this equality to zero may by tested by applying Gaussian elimination to the Macaulay matrix. This provides a computational complexity  where  is the maximum degree of input polynomials.

Another case where the computation of the resultant may provide useful information is when the coefficients of the input polynomials are polynomials in a small number of indeterminates, often called parameters. In this case, the resultant, if not zero, defines a hypersurface in the parameter space.

U-resultant 
Macaulay's resultant provides a method, called "U-resultant" by Macaulay, for solving systems of polynomial equations.

Given  homogeneous polynomials  of degrees  in   indeterminates  over a field ,  their U-resultant is the resultant of the  polynomials  where

The U-resultant is a homogeneous polynomial in  It is zero if and only if the common zeros of  form a projective algebraic set of positive dimension (that is, there are infinitely many projective zeros over an  algebraically closed extension of ). If the U-resultant is not zero, its degree is the Bézout bound 
The U-resultant factorizes over an algebraically closed extension of  into a product of linear forms. In other words, the U-resultant provides a completely explicit version of Bézout's theorem.

Extension to more polynomials and computation
The U-resultant as defined by Macaulay requires the number of homogeneous polynomials in the system of equations to be  , where   is the number of indeterminates.

where, for each ,  runs over the linear space consisting of zero and the homogeneous polynomials of degree .

Reducing the Macaulay matrix by a variant of Gaussian elimination, one obtains a square matrix of linear forms in  The determinant of this matrix is the U-resultant. As with the original U-resultant, it is zero if and only if  have infinitely many common projective zeros (that is if the projective algebraic set defined by  has infinitely many points over an algebraic closure of ).

See also
Elimination theory
Subresultant
Nonlinear algebra

Notes

References

External links
 

Polynomials
Determinants
Computer algebra